Patrik Isaksson (born April 8, 1973 in Västerås) is a former breaststroke swimmer from Sweden, who won several titles in the short course championships. A member of Swedish club Västerås SS, he competed for his native country at the 2000 Summer Olympics in Sydney, Australia, where he finished in 26th position in the 100 m breaststroke.

High performances
1995: SC World Championships
8th 100m breaststroke (1:01.72)
11th 200m breaststroke (2:15.19)
1996: SC European Championships
1st 50m breaststroke (27.76)
2nd 100m breaststroke (1:00.45)
1997: SC World Championships
1st 100m breaststroke (59.99)
5th 4×100m medley relay
1998: SC European Championships
1st 100m breaststroke (59.22)
2nd 50m breaststroke (27.21)
1999: LC European Championships
3rd 4×100m medley relay
1999: SC World Championships
1st 100m breaststroke (59.69)
2nd 50m breaststroke (27.57)
2nd 4×100m medley relay
1999: SC European Championships
2nd 100m breaststroke (59.32)
4th 50m breaststroke (27.59)
1st 4×50m medley relay
2000: Olympic Games
26th 100m breaststroke (1:03.05)
2001: LC World Championships
14th 50m breaststroke (28.59)
2001: SC European Championships
7th 50m breaststroke (27.31)
3rd 4×50m medley relay (1:35.68)

Clubs
Västerås SS

References

External links
Profile on FINA-website

1973 births
Living people
Swedish male breaststroke swimmers
Olympic swimmers of Sweden
Swimmers at the 2000 Summer Olympics
Sportspeople from Västerås
Medalists at the FINA World Swimming Championships (25 m)
Västerås SS swimmers